Pyay Yazawin is a lost Burmese chronicle that covers the history of Pyay (Prome), including that of Prome Kingdom from 1278 to 1542. It was referenced in the later chronicles of Maha Yazawin and Hmannan Yazawin.

See also
 List of rulers of Prome

References

Bibliography
 

Burmese chronicles